The 1960–61 season of the European Cup Winners' Cup club football tournament was won by Italian club Fiorentina in two-legged final victory against Rangers of Scotland.

Organised by the Mitropa Cup committee, this tournament's edition was recognised by UEFA in 1963, after lobbying by the Italian Football Federation.
This was the first season that the tournament took place for the winners of each European country's domestic cup, and was the only one to be decided in a two-legged final. Only ten sides entered the competition, partially due to the low expectations for the new tournament among association football fans, and also to the unofficial nature of this edition. 

SC Dynamo Berlin was the winner of the 1959 FDGB-Pokal and should naturally have represented East Germany in the 1960–61 European Cup Winners' Cup. However, the German Football Association of the GDR (DFV) found local rival and league runners-up ASK Vorwärts Berlin to be a more suitable representative of East Germany in the competition.

It is a myth that the low number of entrants was due to few countries already having a domestic cup competition: as happened for the first edition of the European Cup, entrance criteria could be changed by each national federation.  Fiorentina entered as runners-up to Juventus in both Coppa Italia and Serie A, Czechoslovakia sent the winners of an unofficial League Cup, and both Hungary and East Germany enrolled their league runners-up.

Preliminary round 

|}

First leg

Second leg

Rangers won 5–4 on aggregate.

Rudá Hvězda Brno won 3–2 on aggregate.

Quarter-finals 

|}

First leg

Second leg

Rangers won 11–0 on aggregate.

Wolverhampton Wanderers won 5–2 on aggregate.

Fiorentina won 9–2 on aggregate.

Dinamo Zagreb won 2–0 on aggregate.

Semi-finals 

|}

First leg

Second leg

Rangers won 3–1 on aggregate.

Fiorentina won 4–2 on aggregate.

Final

First leg

Second leg

Fiorentina won 4–1 on aggregate.

See also
1960–61 European Cup
1960–61 Inter-Cities Fairs Cup

References

External links 
 1960-61 season at UEFA website
 Cup Winners' Cup results at Rec.Sport.Soccer Statistics Foundation
 Cup Winners Cup Seasons 1960-61 – results, protocols
 website History Eurocup (Russian) Cup Winners' Cup 1960/61 - protocols games
 website RS Football Archive 1960–61 Cup Winners Cup

3
UEFA Cup Winners' Cup seasons